Russell is an unincorporated community in Lake County, Illinois, United States. The community is located on Russell Road, a few miles east of Interstate 94, and was named for industrialist and political figure Russell Sage, who was connected with the Chicago, Milwaukee, St. Paul and Pacific Railroad (Milwaukee Road, later Soo Line Railroad and now, Canadian Pacific) which bisects the village. Russell has a post office with ZIP code 60075.

References

Unincorporated communities in Illinois
Unincorporated communities in Lake County, Illinois